Ett farligt frieri, or A dangerous proposal, aka A dangerous wooing is the first silent film directed by Swedish director Rune Carlsten in 1919.

The film has been the subject of a restoration in 2010 with intertitles in Swedish and English by the Swedish Film Institute.

Synopsis
In a small village in the Swedish mountains, all the boys are in love with Aslaugh, the daughter of rich farmer Knut Husaby. Thormund, the wealthiest farmer in the village proposes to marry his son Ola to Aslaug. Husaby is in favour of this marriage but asks his daughter whether she agrees. Aslaug refuses because she is in love with Tore Naesset, a small-holder's son. Her father is violently opposed to such a wedding and sends her to his summer farm, high in the mountains, hoping she'll change her mind. 
Tore manages to join Aslaug at the summer farm but on his way back on the only available road which passes by Husaby farm, he gets a hard beating from Huseby who lets him go with an ironic promise: "If next Saturday you manage to slip past the Husaby wolf and his cubs, the girl will be yours". 
The following week, Tore tries to sneak past the farm without success. He then decides to climb the steep cliff which borders the summer farm on the river side. After nearly falling, he manages to reach the top, exhausted. Husaby, impressed by his courage, agrees to let him marry Aslaug.

Cast

Lars Hanson - Tore Næsset 
 Gull Cronvall - Aslaug 
 Theodor Blick - Knut Husaby, Aslaug's father 
 Hjalmar Peters - Thormund, rich farmer
 Kurt Welin - Ola, Thormund's son 
 Hugo Tranberg - Sigurd Husaby 
Gösta Cederlund - Eyvind Husaby 
 Hilda Castegren - Tore's mother 
Torsten Bergström - fiddler

Production
The film was based on Bjørnstjerne Bjørnson's novella A dangerous courtship, published in 1856. 
It was filmed at AB Skandia studios in Långängen with exteriors from the areas around the Hardanger Fjord in Norway. 
It premièred on 26 December 1919 in Gothenburg and Stockholm.

References

External links
 
 Ett farlig frieri (1919) (A dangerous proposal) at A Cinema History
 

1910s historical films
1919 films
Swedish silent films
Swedish black-and-white films
Films based on short fiction
Swedish historical films
1910s Swedish-language films